Eustaquio "Bombín" Pedroso (September 20, 1886 - death date unknown) was a Cuban baseball pitcher in the Cuban League and the Negro leagues. He played from 1907 to 1927 with several ballclubs, including Club Fé, All Cubans, and the Cuban Stars (West). In the 1909 Cuban-American Major League Clubs Series, Pedroso pitched a no-hitter against the Detroit Tigers.

References

External links
 and Baseball-Reference Cuban and Black Baseball stats and Seamheads

1886 births
Year of death unknown
Cuban League players
Almendares (baseball) players
All Cubans players
Cuban Stars (West) players
Club Fé players
San Francisco Park players
Habana players
Matanzas players
Cuban expatriate baseball players in the United States